Mentor is an unincorporated community in Jefferson Township, Dubois County, in the U.S. state of Indiana.

History
Mentor was founded in 1881 by Francis M. Sanders. Sanders, an admirer of President James A. Garfield, named the settlement for Garfield's hometown of Mentor, Ohio.

An old variant name of the community was called Altoga. A post office ran with this name from 1883 to 1908.

Geography

References

Unincorporated communities in Dubois County, Indiana
Unincorporated communities in Indiana
Jasper, Indiana micropolitan area